This is a list of  narrow-gauge railways in the United States.

Narrow-gauge railroads of various sizes existed across the US, especially during the late 1800s, with the most popular gauge being  gauge. Some of the more famous  gauge railroad networks in the US were based in California, Colorado, and Hawaii. These narrow-gauge lines were easier to build than standard gauge and cost significantly less to construct. Some of the lines of these former networks still exist in the present day and continue to use  gauge track, while the rest were either widened to standard gauge or abandoned (see table below).

Railroads

See also

Narrow-gauge railroads in the United States
Heritage railway
2 ft gauge railroads in the United States
2 ft 6 in gauge railroads in the United States
3 ft gauge railways in the United Kingdom
Three foot six inch gauge railways in the United States
Three foot gauge locomotives on the U.S. National Register of Historic Places
Rio Grande 168 (operational)
Rio Grande 169 (static display)
Rio Grande 223 (stored)
Rio Grande 278 (static display)
Rio Grande 315 (operational)
Rio Grande 463 (operational)
ET&WNC No. 12 (operational)
Eureka Locomotive (operational)
Glenbrook Locomotive (operational)

References

Bibliography